Ronald Wayne Shepherd (born October 27, 1960) is an American former professional baseball player. The former outfielder played part of three seasons in Major League Baseball, from 1984 until 1986, for the Toronto Blue Jays; his pro career lasted 15 years (1979–93), including four years in the Mexican League.

Career
Shepherd was selected by Toronto in the second round of the 1979 Major League Baseball Draft out of Kilgore High School.  During the closing month of the 1984 season, the Blue Jays recalled Shepherd from the Triple-A Syracuse Chiefs, and during his big league debut he appeared in 12 games, nine as a pinch runner. He was hitless in four plate appearances.  He split 1985 between Toronto and Syracuse, and got into 38 games with the Blue Jays, but made only four hits in 35 at bats. Then, in 1986, he was recalled from Syracuse in late May and spent the last four months of the season on the Toronto roster. He collected 14 hits in 69 at bats, for a .203 batting average, with four doubles and his only two MLB home runs.

In 115 major league games, Shepherd had only 114 plate appearances, highlighted his extensive use as a pinch runner. He scored 23 runs, stole three bases (with one caught stealing), and had 18 total hits.  He walked five times, and had 37 strikeouts.

Sources
, or Retrosheet
Pelota Binaria (Venezuelan Winter League)

1960 births
Living people
African-American baseball players
American expatriate baseball players in Canada
American expatriate baseball players in Mexico
Baseball players from Texas
Bravos de León players
Cardenales de Lara players
American expatriate baseball players in Venezuela
Indianapolis Indians players
Kinston Eagles players
Knoxville Blue Jays players
Leones de Yucatán players
Louisville Redbirds players
Major League Baseball outfielders
Medicine Hat Blue Jays players
People from Longview, Texas
Petroleros de Minatitlán players
Sultanes de Monterrey players
Syracuse Chiefs players
Toronto Blue Jays players
21st-century African-American people
20th-century African-American sportspeople